"C'est dit" is a 2009 song recorded by French singer and composer Calogero. It was the first single off his fifth studio album L'Embellie and was released on 16 February 2009. It was highly successful in Belgium (Wallonia) and on French digital chart.

Background and theme
The song was written by Jean-Jacques Goldman, that was the first collaboration between both artists. In various interviews, Calogero explained why he wanted a song written by Goldman: "I wanted to work with him first because I think he is a great author. I love his lyrics more than his music. I found interesting to make him work on a music that has no refrain. He said to me that it was bizarre, my song. I told him: "Find the hook". He found two : "On est riche que de ses amis" and "C'est dit"." Calogero also said he wanted a "moving" text to express his feelings for his friends.

Calogero composed the music with more acoustic and stripped arrangements than on his previous albums, and used an acoustic guitar. The introduction played on the piano provides "strong melancholy emotions".

The song deals with friendship, an important theme for the singer. He said : "This is a song that says several things: despite what you may succeed in the life, the true wealth is not being alone is to be surrounded by two or three true friends. It is also a way to say that we haven't many friends." Casimir appears in the music video because the singer wanted to refer to what he loved in his childhood.

Chart performances
In Belgium (Wallonia), the song went to No. 31 on the Ultratop 50 on 28 March 2009, then climbed quickly and eventually topped the chart six weeks later. It remained for eight weeks in the top ten. In Switzerland, the song was briefly ranked, remaining for three weeks at the bottom of the single chart. In France, "C'est dit" was much aired on radio, peaking at number seven on the SNEP airplay chart on 29 May 2009.

Track listings
 CD single

 Digital download

Charts and sales

Peak positions

End of year charts

References

External links
 "C'est dit", official music video

2009 singles
Calogero (singer) songs
Ultratop 50 Singles (Wallonia) number-one singles
Songs written by Jean-Jacques Goldman
Songs with music by Calogero (singer)
2009 songs
Mercury Records singles
Universal Music Group singles